James Bovaird Stanfield (January 1, 1947 – November 19, 2009) was a Canadian professional ice hockey player. He played in 7 NHL games for the Los Angeles Kings in parts of three seasons between 1970 and 1971. The rest of career, which lasted from 1967 to 1977, was spent in the minor leagues.

Born in Dixie, Ontario, Stanfield was the younger brother of NHL forwards Jack Stanfield and Fred Stanfield. In the 1975–76 season, both Fred and Jim played in the same home city (Buffalo, New York) but for different teams: Fred with the NHL's Sabres and Jim with the NAHL's Norsemen.

Career statistics

Regular season and playoffs

References

External links
 

1947 births
2009 deaths
Buffalo Norsemen players
Canadian ice hockey centres
Dallas Black Hawks players
Denver Spurs players
Ice hockey people from Ontario
London Nationals players
Los Angeles Kings players
Portland Buckaroos players
St. Catharines Black Hawks players
San Diego Gulls (WHL) players
Spokane Jets players
Sportspeople from Mississauga
Springfield Kings players